Limentra may refer to two rivers in central-northern Italy:
 Limentra di Sambuca or Limentra occidentale 
 Limentra orientale or Limentra di Treppio